The 1969 Western Michigan Broncos football team represented Western Michigan University in the Mid-American Conference (MAC) during the 1969 NCAA University Division football season.  In their sixth season under head coach Bill Doolittle, the Broncos compiled a 4–6 record (2–4 against MAC opponents), finished in a tie for fifth place in the MAC, and outscored their opponents, 216 to 203.  The team played its home games at Waldo Stadium in Kalamazoo, Michigan.

The team's statistical leaders included Ted Grignon with 1,001 passing yards, Roger Lawson with 1,205 rushing yards, and Greg Flaska with 372 receiving yards. Defensive tackle Mike Siwek and tackle Paul Minnis were the team captains. Siwek also received the team's most outstanding player award.

Schedule

References

Western Michigan
Western Michigan Broncos football seasons
Western Michigan Broncos football